Western Branch High School is a suburban high school in Chesapeake, Virginia, USA. Established in 1968, it currently has over 2200 students. The two feeder schools of WBHS are Joliff Middle School and Western Branch Middle School. After it was determined that redistricting due to the opening of Grassfield High School was not going to impact WBHS, a $40,000,000 construction project was funded to accommodate the larger student body and modernize the technology and facilities. This construction included a two-story wing, providing natural lighting for the students, and renovation of the rest of the school. The construction was finished in early September 2010, while the renovation of the existing school was finished in the middle 2010-2011 school year.

Notable alumni
 Jimmy Anderson - MLB Player
 Dre Bly - National Football League football player
 Randy Blythe - Lead singer for heavy metal band Lamb of God
 Patricia Southall - Former Miss Virginia USA and wife of retired NFL star Emmitt Smith
Josh Baker- Tight End for the Tampa Bay Buccaneers of National Football league
Byron Robinson- 2016 Olympic 400 meter Hurdler (USA)
Mac Quayle, composer
Andre Douglas- NASA Astronaut
yvngxchris- Rapper

References

External links
 Western Branch H.S. Web - Official Site
 Western Branch H.S.Football Web

Educational institutions established in 1968
1968 establishments in Virginia
Public high schools in Virginia
Schools in Chesapeake, Virginia